James Robert Shilling (May 14, 1914 – September 12, 1986) was a professional baseball infielder who played for the 1939 Cleveland Indians and 1939 Philadelphia Phillies of Major League Baseball (MLB).

Biography
Shilling's minor league career spanned 1934 to 1948, with 1192 total games played for eight different teams; he did not play professionally for three seasons (1943–1945) during World War II.

In 1939, Shilling's only season in the major leagues, he played in 31 games for the Cleveland Indians and 11 games for the Philadelphia Phillies, primarily as a second baseman. He registered a .282 batting average with 16 RBIs and no home runs. Defensively, he committed 14 errors in 198 total chances for a .929 fielding percentage.

Born in Tulsa, Oklahoma, in 1914, Shilling served in the United States Navy during World War II. He died in his hometown in 1986 and is buried there.

References

External links

1914 births
1986 deaths
Major League Baseball second basemen
Cleveland Indians players
Philadelphia Phillies players
Fargo-Moorhead Twins players
Zanesville Greys players
Milwaukee Brewers (minor league) players
New Orleans Pelicans (baseball) players
Louisville Colonels players
Newark Bears players
Nashville Vols players
Tulsa Oilers (baseball) players
Baseball players from Oklahoma
Sportspeople from Tulsa, Oklahoma
United States Navy personnel of World War II